Leon was Ancient Greek mathematician and pupil of Neocleides. His book Elements was overshadowed by Euclid's work of the same name.

Proclus states the following in his Commentary on the First Book of Euclid's Elements:But Neoclides was junior to Leodamas, and his disciple was Leon; who added many things to those thought of by former geometricians. So that Leon also constructed elements more accurate, both on account of their multitude, and on account of the use which they exhibit: and besides this, he discovered a method of determining when a problem, whose investigation is sought for, is possible, and when it is impossible.

References

External links
 

ancient Greek mathematicians